Epacris gnidioides, commonly known as Budawangs cliff-heath, is a species of flowering plant in the heath family Ericaceae and is endemic to a restricted area of New South Wales. It is a small, creeping shrub with hairy branches, sharply-pointed lance-shaped leaves, and tube-shaped, white flowers.

Description
The leaves are thin, concave and covered with long, soft hairs.

Taxonomy
This species was first formally described in 1927 by Victor Samuel Summerhayes who gave it the name Rupicola gnidioides in the  Bulletin of Miscellaneous Information from specimens collected in 1927 by Frederick A. Rodway near the Ettrema River, south west of Nowra in a "cleft in sandstone cliff". In 2015, Elizabeth Anne Brown changed the name to Epacris gnidioides in Australian Systematic Botany. 

In 1992, Ian Telford raised the genus Budawangia and changed the name Rupicola gninioides to Budawangia gnidioides in the journal Telopea, but that name is regarded as a synonym of Epacris gnidioides by the Australian Plant Census.

Distribution and habitat
Budawangs cliff-heath grows in rock crevices and on sandy ledges at the base of sandstone cliffs on the edges of forest and heath and is only known from the northern Budawang Range in south-eastern New South Wales.

Conservation status
Epacris gnidioides is listed as "vulnerable" under the Australian Government Environment Protection and Biodiversity Conservation Act 1999 (EPBC) Act and the New South Wales Biodiversity Conservation Act 2016. The main threats to its survival are its narrow distribution, inappropriate fire regimes, and use of sandstone caves for camping.

References 

gnidioides
Ericales of Australia
Flora of New South Wales
Plants described in 1927